PTV National HD is a Pakistani free-to-air television channel owned by the Pakistan Television Corporation. It mainly broadcasts in regional languages of Pakistan.

History
The channel was launched in 2004.

Programming 
Sports broadcast behalf of PTV Sports HD:-

International cricket

References

External links

National, PTV National
Television networks in Pakistan